The 111th Engineer Brigade is an engineer brigade of the United States Army. It is a subordinate unit of the West Virginia Army National Guard with units located throughout West Virginia. It is headquartered at Eleanor, West Virginia, formerly in St. Albans, West Virginia. The 111th Engineer Brigade relocated in 2005 to its new facility at the Winfield Locks and Dam.

Insignia
DISTINCTIVE BADGE: A gold color metal and enamel device consisting of a black enamel diamond shape bearing a white enamel powder horn, mouth to the right, ferruled and stringed gold, at the top a semi-circular scarlet enamel scroll folded back at each side, terminating behind the diamond shape a base and inscribed at the top "MINUTEMEN FOR FREEDOM" in gold letters. SYMBOLISM: The white powder horn represents the early pioneers, the Greenbrier Long Rifles of the day and the readiness of the present 111th Engineer Brigade. The black diamond shape alludes to the coal fields of West Virginia. Scarlet and white are colors used for Engineer units.

Organization

1092nd Engineer Battalion – Parkersburg, West Virginia
 Headquarters and Headquarters Company (HHC)
Forward Support Company
115th Engineer Company
119th Engineer Company (Sapper)
601st Engineer Company
821st Engineer Company
922nd Engineer Detachment

771st Troop Command – Gassaway, West Virginia
753rd Ordnance Company (EOD) Explosive Ordnance Disposal
863rd Military Police Company
157th Military Police Company
3664th Support Maintenance Company
1935th Contingency Contracting Team
156th Military Police Detachment(Law and Order)

772nd Aviation Troop Command – Williamstown, West Virginia
Headquarters and Headquarters Detachment
Company C, 2d Battalion (General Support), 104th Aviation Regiment
Company C, 1st Battalion (Assault), 150th Aviation Regimemt
Company B, 1st Battalion (S&S), 224th Aviation Regiment
Detachment 1, 642d Support Battalion (Aviation)
Detachment 28, Operational Support Airlift Command

References

External links
GlobalSecurity.org: 111th Engineer Brigade
The Institute of Heraldry: 111th Engineer Brigade

Engineer 111
West Virginia Army National Guard